Grave Human Genuine is a studio album by German progressive metal band Dark Suns. It was released as a jewelcase, as well as a limited edition Digipak, with a bonus song.
  
Andy Schmidt of Disillusion performed guest vocals on the song "Flies in Amber".

"The Chameleon Defect" was made into a music video, under the name "The Chameleon Conflict".

Track listing
 "Stampede" – 3:07
 "Flies in Amber" – 9:52
 "Thornchild" – 7:11
 "Rapid Eye Moment" – 7:20
 "Amphibian Halo" – 5:16
 "The Chameleon Defect" – 6:08
 "Free of You" – 8:42
 "Papillon" – 10:28

Bonus tracks
 "29" – 6:22

Credits
 Niko Knappe – vocals, drums
 Maik Knappe – Guitars
 Torsten Wenzel – Guitars
 Kristoffer Gildenlöw – Bass
 Thomas Bremer – Keyboards
 Vurtox (Andy Schmidt) – Guest vocals on "Flies in Amber"

References

2008 albums
Dark Suns albums